Old Haileyburians may refer to the former pupils of two schools called "Haileybury".
Haileybury and Imperial Service College in Hertford Heath, England
Haileybury, Melbourne, in Australia

See also
 List of people educated at Haileybury, Melbourne for a list of old boys of the school in Melbourne